McClintic is a surname. Notable people with the surname include: 

 Guthrie McClintic (1893–1961), American theatre and film director and producer
 James V. McClintic (1878–1948), American politician from Texas and Oklahoma

Fictional characters 
 McClintic Sphere, a character in Thomas Pynchon novel V.

Other uses
 T. B. McClintic (boarding tug), a United States Public Health Service vessel of 1932, named for Dr Thomas B. McClintic (c1873-1912)

See also
 McClintic-Marshall House, at Lehigh University in Pennsylvania
 McClintock (disambiguation)